Flesh Power Dominion (typeset as FLESH_POWER_DOMINION) is the third studio album by Callenish Circle and the band's first album to be released through Metal Blade Records. It was released in 2002 along with a digipak edition that contained two bonus tracks. The name is a movie quote by "Pinhead" from the movie Hellraiser III.

Track listing

Credits
Callenish Circle
 Patrick Savelkoul − vocals
 Remy Dieteren − guitar
 Ronny Tyssen − guitar
 Roland Schuschke − bass
 Gavin Harte − drums

Additional personnel
Rick Bouwman – digital sound effects
Andy Classen – mixing, producer
Georg Classen – producer
Niklas Sundin – artwork, design
Sander Van Der Heide – mastering

References 

2002 albums
Callenish Circle albums
Albums produced by Andy Classen